Entegham is an Iranian newspaper in Fars Province. The Concessionaire of this newspaper was Mohammadhasan Naserol'eslam and it was published in Shiraz since 1916.

See also
List of magazines and newspapers of Fars

References

Newspapers published in Fars Province
Mass media in Fars Province
Qajar Iran